Class of '78 is a big band jazz album recorded by Buddy Rich in 1977.  Originally released by Century Records as a "direct-to-disc" LP album Limited Edition, it was widely released in 1978, and re-issued on Compact Disc as The Greatest Drummer That Ever Lived with "The Best Band I Ever Had".

Track listing 
LP side A:
"Birdland" (Zawinul) – 6:46
"Bouncin' with Bud" (Powell) – 5:55
LP side B:
"Cape Verdean Blues" (Silver) – 6:17
"Fiesta" (Corea) – 6:23
"Funk City Ola" (Mintzer) – 4:30

Personnel 
 Buddy Rich – drums
 Alan Gauvin – alto saxophone, soprano saxophone, flute
 Chuck Wilson – alto saxophone, soprano saxophone, flute
 Steve Marcus – tenor saxophone, soprano saxophone
 Gary Bribek – tenor saxophone, percussion (cowbell)
 Greg Smith – baritone saxophone, percussion (cabasa)
 Chuck Schmidt – trumpet
 Dean Pratt – trumpet
 John Marshall – trumpet
 Danny Hayes – trumpet
 Matt Johnson – trombone
 Dale Kirkland – trombone
 Edward Eby – bass trombone
 Barry Kiener – keyboards
 Tommy Warrington – bass

References 

Great American Gramophone Company GADD 1030
Gryphon 781 (UK)
DCC Compact Classics 606 (1990 CD retitled re-issue, The Greatest Drummer...)
Class of '78 at discogs.com

1978 albums
Buddy Rich albums